Travel with Rivals is a Hong Kong television travel programme premiered on 6 April 2016, produced by HK Television Entertainment and broadcast on ViuTV.

Overview 
The programme brings together two people from different backgrounds, with conflicting core values, for a five-day trip to other parts of the world.

Episodes 
The first episode lasted one hour, with the first half-hour serving as a preview of the series.

References 

Travel television series
ViuTV original programming
2016 Chinese television series debuts